USS S-3 (SS-107) was the prototype of the "Government-type" S-class submarines of the United States Navy. ( was the "Holland-type" prototype and  the "Lake-type".) Her keel was laid down on 29 August 1917 by the Portsmouth Navy Yard. She was launched on 21 December 1918 sponsored by Mrs. William L. Hill, and commissioned on 30 January 1919.

Following outfitting and trials, S-3 began her career with training operations along the New England coast operating out of Portsmouth and New London, Connecticut. In 1920, she twice visited Havana, Cuba: first in January, and again in December.

In July 1921, she was attached to Submarine Division 12 (SubDiv 12) which, along with SubDiv 18, was to rendezvous off Portsmouth for the longest voyage on record, at that time, for American submarines. The two divisions were assigned to the Asiatic Fleet as Submarine Flotilla 3 (SubFlot 3) at the Cavite Naval Station in the Philippine Islands. They sailed via the Panama Canal to Pearl Harbor, where S-3 was detached and reassigned to operate on the United States West Coast from Mare Island, California. The two divisions continued on and successfully completed the voyage, arriving at Cavite on 1 December.

S-3 departed Pearl Harbor on 9 November and sailed to the U.S. West Coast where she operated until mid-July 1923. On 17 July, she took departure from San Francisco Bay to retransit the Panama Canal en route to New London.

During the remainder of 1923 and the years following, into 1927, she ranged the United States East Coast conducting training operations and evaluating new techniques in submarine development.

In July 1927, S-3 and S-1 formed SubDiv 4 and began a schedule which included operational cruises to the Panama Canal Zone in the spring months of 1928–1930. The remaining months of those years were spent in operations along the New England coast.

Early in 1931, S-3 was ordered to Philadelphia, Pennsylvania, for inactivation. She was decommissioned there on 24 March and laid up. She was struck from the Naval Vessel Register on 25 January 1937 and subsequently scrapped.

References

Ships built in Kittery, Maine
S-03
1918 ships